This is a list of the current Estonian commanders:

Superior officers
 Lieutenant Generals and Vice Admirals

 Martin Herem

 Major Generals and Rear Admirals 

 Meelis Kiili
 Indrek Sirel
 Veiko-Vello Palm

 Igor Schvede (Merevägi)

 Brigadier-Generals and Commodores 

 Artur Tiganik
 Riho Ühtegi
 Enno Mõts
 Ilmar Tamm
 Vahur Karus

 Jüri Saska (Merevägi)

 Rauno Sirk; (Õhuvägi)

Senior officers
Colonels and (Naval) Captains

Jüri Järveläinen
Aarne Ermus
Albert Helme

Viljar Schiff
Artur Suzik
Aivar Salekešin
Kajari Klettenberg
Eduard Kikas
Peeter Läns
Aivar Kokka
Vahur Väljamäe
Mirko Arroküll
Aron Kalmus
Risto Lumi
Jaak Mee
Vahur Murulaid
Urmas Nigul
Eero Rebo

Andres Hairk
Kalev Koidumäe
Margus Koplimägi
Vitali Lokk
Leon Meier
Ain Rekkand
Mati Tikerpuu
Tarmo Metsa
Mart Vendla
Andrus Merilo
Taivo Rõkk
Meelis Sarapuu
Viktor Kalnitski
Mait Müürisepp
Märt Plakk
Margo Grosberg
Margus Kuul
Janno Märk

Sten Sepper (Merevägi)
Roman Lukas (Merevägi)
Indrek Hanson (Merevägi)
Ivo Värk (Merevägi)
Johan Elias Seljamaa (Merevägi)

Jaak Tarien (Õhuvägi)
Arvo Palumäe (Õhuvägi)
Riivo Valge (Õhuvägi)
Toomas Susi (Õhuvägi)
Janek Lehiste (Õhuvägi)

See also
 Military of Estonia
 List of former Estonian commanders

References

Estonian military leaders